Alberto García may refer to:

 Alberto García (swimmer) (born 1957), Mexican former swimmer
 Alberto García Aspe (born 1967), Mexican football midfielder
 Alberto García (runner) (born 1971), Spanish long-distance and cross-country runner
 Alberto García (Spanish footballer) (born 1985), Spanish football goalkeeper
 Alberto García (footballer, born 1993), Mexican football forward